Khusrau Firuz was a Justanid king who ruled briefly in 919. He was the brother and successor of Ali of Dailam. Before becoming the ruler of the Justanids, Khusrau Firuz aided his brother Ali in murdering their brother Justan III. Ali then crowned himself as the new ruler of the Justanids, but was shortly killed by the Sallarid ruler Muhammad bin Musafir, who was Justan's son-in-law. Khusrau Firuz then succeeded him as the ruler of the Justanids, but was also killed by Muhammad bin Musafir. Khusrau Firuz was then succeeded by his son Siyahchashm.

Sources 
 

919 deaths
10th-century Iranian people
Justanids
Year of birth unknown